Imre Tiidemann (born 24 September 1970) is an Estonian modern pentathlete. He competed at the 1992, 1996 and 2000 Summer Olympics.

References

External links
 

1970 births
Living people
Estonian male modern pentathletes
Olympic modern pentathletes of Estonia
Modern pentathletes at the 1992 Summer Olympics
Modern pentathletes at the 1996 Summer Olympics
Modern pentathletes at the 2000 Summer Olympics
Sportspeople from Tallinn